Lotus jacobaeus is a species of flowering plant of the family Fabaceae. The species is endemic to Cape Verde. It was described by Carolus Linnaeus in 1753 in the second volume of Species Plantarum.

Description
Its petals are coloured yellow or yellow and purple.

Distribution
The species occurs on most islands of Cape Verde, except Brava and Santa Luzia. It grows in semi-arid and sub-humid zones.

References

Further reading
 Hepper, F.N., 1958 Papilionoideae, Flora West Tropical Africa. Keay, R.W.J.

External links
 

jacobaeus
Endemic flora of Cape Verde
Taxa named by Carl Linnaeus